Hejaz railway station is a former main railway station in central Damascus, Syria close to the Marjeh Square.

The station was put into operation under the Ottoman Empire in 1907, when the first section of the line to the south of Tabuk was opened. In 1909 the trains circulated frequently between Damascus and Medina.

It was part of the Hejaz Railway, and there were many railway stations of the railway. This includes 'Hejaz railway stations' at: al-Taibe, Amman, Anese, Bosra, D'ara, Derra, Djizeh, el-Akhthar, el-Ula, Haifa, Jisra, Kadem, Khamees, Makarin, Ma'an, Marfaq, Meda'in Saleh, Muazzem, Tabuk, Wadi Kelt, Wadi Rum, Zarqaa and Zat ul Hajj.

The passenger building, designed by the Spanish architect Fernando De Aranda, was commissioned in 1913. The building later became a historical monument and a Swiss-made locomotive was exhibited in front of it.

The station's interior has a beautiful decorated ceiling. The actual platforms of the station are closed.

See also
Hejaz railway
Hedjaz Jordan Railway
Damascus–Amman train
Aleppo railway station
Chemins de Fer Syriens

References

Ottoman architecture in Damascus
Railway stations opened in 1913
Buildings and structures in Damascus
Railway stations in Syria
1913 establishments in the Ottoman Empire
Hejaz railway